Virginia L. Miller is a microbiologist known for her work on studying the factors leading to disease caused by bacteria. Miller is an elected fellow of the American Academy of Microbiology (2003) and a former Pew Charitable Trust Biomedical Scholar (1989).

Education and career 
Miller has a B.A. from the University of California, Santa Barbara (1979). She earned her Ph.D. from Harvard University in 1985 where she worked on the expression of genes associated with Cholera toxin. Following her Ph.D., she was a postdoc at Stanford University. She moved to the University of California, Los Angeles in 1988 and earned tenure in 1994. She moved to Washington University in St. Louis in 1996, and then to the University of North Carolina at Chapel Hill in 2008. As of 2021, Miller is a professor of genetics, microbiology, and immunology at the University of North Carolina at Chapel Hill.

Research 
Miller is known for her research into bacterial pathogenesis, the factors leading to the onset of disease from specific species of bacteria. Her early research examined the synthesis of the cholera toxin by Vibrio cholerae and identified environmental signals that lead V. cholerae to express the proteins needed to make the cholera toxin. She went on to examine the mechanisms by which another bacteria pathogen - Yersinia pestis - enters cells and cause disease. She has also worked on how Salmonella and Klebsiella pneumoniae cause disease.In brief, she mostly worked in the areas of Microbiology (69.74%), Yersinia enterocolitica (51.32%) and Virulence (48.03%).

Awards and honors 
In 1989, Miller was named a Pew Scholar. In 2003, Miller was elected a fellow of the American Academy of Microbiology.

Selected publications

References 

University of North Carolina at Chapel Hill faculty
Harvard University alumni
University of California, Santa Barbara alumni
Women microbiologists
Living people
Year of birth missing (living people)
American microbiologists
American women biologists
20th-century American biologists
20th-century American women scientists
21st-century American biologists
21st-century American women scientists